Panayiota Poirazi is a neuroscientist known for her work in modelling dendritic computations. She is an elected member of the European Molecular Biology Organization (EMBO).

Education and career
Poirazi studied at the University of Cyprus from 1992 until 1996. She earned an M.S. from the University of Southern California in 1998, and went on to earn her Ph.D. from there in 2000. Following her Ph.D., she worked at the Alexander Fleming Instite of Immunology in Greece until 2001, when she moved to the Foundation for Research and Technology-Hellas (FORTH) in Crete, Greece in 2004. As of 2021, she is the director of research at the Institute of Molecular Biology and Biotechnology (IMBB) at the Foundation for Research and Technology-Hellas (FORTH).

Research 

Poirazi is known for her work in neurobiology where she focuses on dendrites, the portion of a neuron that propagates signals. Her early research generated predictive models of how active dendrites and structural plasticity enhance storage capacity in single neurons. She has used biophysical models of pyramidal neurons to show that dendrites of these cells integrate inputs in a sigmoidal manner, enabling the neurons to act as two-layer neural network devices. Poirazi has built a circuit-level model of the hippocampus that shows how memories are linked through time. She has developed and applied biophysical models to explain how human neurons compute information, with a focus on solving the XOR problem.

Selected publications

Awards and honors 
In 2017, Poirazi was elected a member of the European Molecular Biology Organization. In 2018, she received a  Friedrich Wilhelm Bessel Research Award from the Alexander von Humboldt Foundation.

References

External links 
 

University of Southern California alumni
University of Cyprus alumni
Women neuroscientists
1974 births
Living people